Flower in the Gun Barrel is a 2008 documentary film focusing on the process of reconciliation and forgiveness in post-genocide Rwanda. The film depicts both the current conditions in Rwanda and the buildup to the genocide in 1994. It is unique in that it illustrates the complex challenges of average citizens attempting to forgive the neighbors who slaughtered their families. It is a testament to what human beings are capable of. The topic of forgiveness, and the difficulty of coming to terms with those who have killed one's parents, siblings, children and neighbors, is a universal theme that comes to life through the example of Rwanda.

Synopsis
To a large extent, the film consists of interviews with genocide survivors, many of whom were children in 1994. In all, over thirty survivors, perpetrators, and experts were interviewed for the film. In these interviews, the survivors discuss what it means to be a Rwandan and to live next door to people who killed their families. The survivors describe how they deal with their country's request that they forgive one another and move on, so that Rwanda can rebuild and unify itself. Perpetrators' views illuminate the madness that seized the culture in 1994; exploring the experience of apologizing to victims, and examining what it is like to be looked at as a murderer in Rwandan society.

According to Flower in the Gun Barrel, there were a series of events that led to the genocide. The colonization of Rwanda, first by the Germans and then by the Belgians, led to conditions wherein the citizens of Rwanda were intentionally pitted against one another. As a means of dividing and conquering, the Belgian occupiers took what had been primarily economic distinctions between Rwandans and turned them into ethnic distinctions instead. Previously, a Tutsi was defined as a Tutsi if he owned more than ten cows. A Hutu owned less than ten cows and usually worked in the fields. Creating an ethnic class and empowering the Tutsi as "upper class" created hatred and jealousy between these newly imposed "tribes".

In 1959, the Belgians left Rwanda and Hutus quickly took over the government. There was a series of battles between the Hutu and the Tutsi between 1959 and 1994, during which Tutsis would often take sanctuary in churches in order to survive. Knowing this, the Hutu government in 1994 forged partnerships with several Catholic priests, prefects, and nuns, such that this time no Tutsi could be saved. There were innumerable massacres in churches and convents; sometimes officiated by the priests and nuns themselves. In a country of seven million people, one million were killed in one hundred days. The Hutu government succeeded in killing 75% of the Tutsi population.

After 100 days, the RPF stopped the fighting and a year later, over 100,000 perpetrators were in prison. This put an impossible strain on both the economy and the judicial system. The new Rwandan government, led by both Tutsis and Hutus, responded by creating the Gacaca (translated as participative justice) court system. Previously, the Gacaca courts were used to settle domestic disputes and small crimes. Suddenly, the courts were asked to resolve issues of genocide and murder; overwhelming tasks for untrained judges. Prisoners were told that if they admitted their crimes and apologized to their victims, they would be set free. This created a certain amount of doubt amongst the victims, as to the level of contrition the perpetrators actually felt.

Nevertheless, the Rwandan government has appealed to both sides to forgive, so that their children can grow up in a united country. They have rewritten the Constitution of Rwanda so that the country is required to have a plurality of power between Hutus and Tutsis. There is a new national anthem calling for unity. The reality for most Rwandans is that reconciliation is a daily struggle. Hutus live ashamed of what they did, and Tutsis live with the bitter memory of what happened while they try to forgive. It is this struggle that "Flower in the Gun Barrel" depicts.

Crew
Flower in the Gun Barrel is the first documentary feature by director Gabriel Cowan. The Rwandan community has invited the film to have a preview showing at their annual gathering in July, 2008.

It is produced by Amiee Clark and Monica Forouzesh and edited by Woo Tony Joun. The film is narrated by Martin Sheen.

External links
 
 https://web.archive.org/web/20080516202415/http://www.kigalimemorialcentre.org/
 https://web.archive.org/web/20080604131857/http://www.rwandaconvention.org/
 http://gallery.mac.com/themusic#100007

2008 films
American documentary films
Documentary films about the Rwandan genocide
2008 documentary films
Documentary films about reconciliation
2000s English-language films
2000s American films